Jay Johnson Morrow (February 20, 1870 – April 16, 1937) was Chief Engineer of the United States First Army and as Deputy Chief Engineer of the American Expeditionary Force during World War I and Governor of the Panama Canal Zone from 1921 to 1924.

Early life and family 
He was born on February 20, 1870, in Fairview, West Virginia. He was of Scots-Irish descent.  He was the brother of U.S. Senator and Diplomat Dwight Morrow and uncle of Anne Morrow Lindbergh.

Military career 
He graduated from the United States Military Academy at West Point in 1891.  He was then commissioned in the U.S. Army Corps of Engineers.

He was an instructor in military engineering at the United States Military Academy from 1895-96.

He served as military governor of the Philippine Province of Zamboanga from 1901–02.

He served as Engineering Commissioner in the District of Columbia from 1907 to 1909.

During World War I, he served as Chief Engineer of First Army and as Deputy Chief Engineer of the American Expeditionary Force.

He was Governor of the Panama Canal Zone from 1921 to 1924.

Personal life
Morrow married Harriet McMullen Butler on October 15, 1895. She was the daughter of Brigadier General John Gazzam Butler  & Eliza Jane Miller Warnick. She was also the granddaughter of Charles Ward Warnick & Mary Ann Miller.

Death and legacy
He died on April 16, 1937.  His ashes were scattered over the Chagres River, which feeds into the Panama Canal.

References

External links/Sources
Panama Canal Authority biography

1870 births
1937 deaths
United States Military Academy alumni
Governors of the Panama Canal Zone
Members of the Board of Commissioners for the District of Columbia
People from Fairview, West Virginia
Military personnel from West Virginia
United States Army generals of World War I
United States Army generals
United States Military Academy faculty
United States Army Corps of Engineers personnel